Md. Golam Hossain is a Jatiya Party (Ershad) politician and the former Member of Parliament of Kurigram-4.

Career
Hossain was elected to parliament from Kurigram-4 as a Jatiya Party candidate in 1991.

References

Jatiya Party politicians
Living people
5th Jatiya Sangsad members
Year of birth missing (living people)